Lasiopetalum parvuliflorum is a species of flowering plant in the family Malvaceae and is endemic to the south-west of Western Australia. It is an erect, spreading shrub with hairy stems, oblong to linear leaves and green or cream-coloured flowers.

Description
Flowering occurs in September and October.

Taxonomy
Lasiopetalum parvuliflorum was first formally described in 1868 by Ferdinand von Mueller in Fragmenta Phytographiae Australiae from specimens collected by James Drummond. The specific epithet (parvuliflorum) means "very small-flowered".

Distribution and habitat
This lasiopetalum grows near creeks and in winter-wet areas in the Esperance Plains and Mallee biogeographic region of south-western Western Australia.

Conservation status
Lasiopetalum parvuliflorum is listed as "Priority Three" by the Government of Western Australia Department of Biodiversity, Conservation and Attractions, meaning that it is poorly known and known from only a few locations but is not under imminent threat.

References

parvuliflorum
Malvales of Australia
Rosids of Western Australia
Plants described in 1868
Taxa named by Ferdinand von Mueller